Agonopterix clarkei is a moth in the family Depressariidae. It was described by Keifer in 1936. It is found in North America, where it has been recorded from California, Washington and Manitoba.

The larvae feed on Artermisia vulgaris.

References

Moths described in 1936
Agonopterix
Moths of North America